A San Marzano tomato is a variety of plum tomato.

Description
Compared to the Roma tomato, San Marzano tomatoes are thinner and more pointed. The flesh is much thicker with fewer seeds, and the taste is stronger, sweeter, and less acidic.

The San Marzano vines are an indeterminate type vine, and have a somewhat longer season than other paste tomato varieties, making them particularly suitable for warmer climates. As is typical of heirloom plants, San Marzano is an open-pollinated variety that breeds true from generation to generation, making seed saving practical for the home gardener or farmer.

Commercial production and use
Heirloom plant conservationist Amy P. Goldman calls the San Marzano "the most important industrial tomato of the 20th century"; its commercial introduction in 1926 provided canneries with a "sturdy, flawless subject, and breeders with genes they'd be raiding for decades."   Though commercial production of the San Marzano variety is most closely associated with Italy, seeds for the variety are available worldwide.It is an heirloom variety. Canned San Marzanos, when grown in the Valle del Sarno (valley of the Sarno) in Italy in compliance with Italian law, can be classified as Pomodoro San Marzano dell'Agro Sarnese-Nocerino and have the EU "DOP" emblem on the label.

Most San Marzano tomatoes sold commercially are grown in Italy, though they are produced commercially in smaller quantities in other countries. Because of San Marzano's premium pricing, there is an ongoing battle against fraudulent product. On November 22, 2010, the Italian carabinieri confiscated  of improperly labelled canned tomatoes worth €1.2 million.

San Marzano tomatoes, along with Pomodorino del Piennolo del Vesuvio, have been designated as the only tomatoes that can be used for Vera Pizza Napoletana (True Neapolitan Pizza).

Origins
San Marzano tomatoes originate from the small town of San Marzano sul Sarno, near Naples, Italy, and were first grown in volcanic soil in the shadow of Mount Vesuvius. One story goes that the first seed of this tomato came to Campania in 1770, as a gift from the Viceroyalty of Peru to the Kingdom of Naples, and that it was planted in the area of San Marzano sul Sarno.

In the United States, San Marzano tomatoes are the genetic base for another popular paste tomato, the Roma tomato.  The Roma is a cross between a San Marzano and two other varieties (one of which was also a San Marzano hybrid) and was introduced by the USDA's Agricultural Research Service in 1955.

See also
San Marzano sul Sarno
List of tomato cultivars

References

External links
 How to grow San Marzano tomatoes in your garden

Heirloom tomato cultivars
Italian cuisine
Italian products with protected designation of origin
Food and drink introduced in 1926
Ark of Taste foods